Moose Mountain is a  mountain located  west of Bragg Creek, Alberta in Kananaskis Country.

The peak is a popular hiking destination for many (especially Calgary locals) since there is a well maintained trail that makes its way to the summit. During summer month weekends, it is common for a dozen or more people to reach the summit.

Resembling a resting moose on the horizon, the peak was named Moose Mountain in 1949. A Forestry Service fire lookout exists upon the summit, the third building to have occupied the site for this purpose since the first was built in 1929.

Some scenes in the films Land and Brokeback Mountain were shot on and around Moose Mountain. Scenes in the first season of the television series Tin Star were also shot on Moose Mountain.

Members of the public who summit are requested to respect the privacy of the fire lookout staff. As many as 8000 visitors, local and international, are recorded each season. The lookout staff are responsible for over 5000 square kilometres of forest. The lookout staff detects, maps and reports forest fires to a central location, initiating fire suppression. In consideration of the quantity of visitors and the importance of attentiveness of the staff, it is critical that they not be distracted from their duties.
Members of the public are requested to be conscious of inclement weather, and act accordingly. It is NOT recommended to be above the tree line during pending or active lightning storms. Precaution must be taken in view of the active helicopter landing pad, located on the west side of the summit. (Submitted by a former Moose Mountain Lookout Employee)

There are two annual trail running events that go up Moose Mountain: Moose Mountain Trail Races (16 km, 29 km, and 42 km distances), and Iron Legs Mountain Races (60 km, 50 miles, and 100 km distances).

References

External links 
 
 Moose Mountain Bike Trail Society MMBTS
 Government of Alberta Wildfire 

Two-thousanders of Alberta
Alberta's Rockies